Miner Willy is the protagonist in a series of platform games for the ZX Spectrum, MSX, Amstrad CPC and the Commodore 64 home computers. The first two games - Manic Miner and Jet Set Willy were written by Matthew Smith during the early 1980s.

The series started in 1983 with the release of Manic Miner, and was followed up a year later with Jet Set Willy and Jet Set Willy II. Another game in the series, The Perils of Willy, was released solely for the VIC-20.  Andre's Night Off was published as a type-in listing in the June 1984 issue of Computer & Video Games.  In addition, quite a few unofficial sequels, remakes, homages and updates have been released.

Games in the series
Manic Miner, (1983), Bug-Byte / Software Projects
Jet Set Willy, (1984), Software Projects
The Perils of Willy, (1984), Software Projects
Andre's Night Off, 1984, Matthew Smith
Jet Set Willy II, (1985), Software Projects

References

Video game franchises
Video game franchises introduced in 1983
Video games with available source code
Fictional miners